Leontari (meaning Lion in English) is a village and a community in the southwestern part of Arcadia, Greece, seat of the former municipality of Falaisia. It is situated on a hillside, 6 km east of Paradeisia, 9 km northwest of Kamara and 9 km south of Megalopoli. The community consists of the villages Leontari (population 257 in 2011), Gavria (pop. 9), Kalyvia (pop. 11), Kamaritsa (pop. 22) and Kotsiridi (pop. 22). Leontari has several monuments from the Byzantine era, including the richly decorated 14th century Church of the Holy Apostles. The area suffered damage from the 2007 Greek forest fires. It is considered a traditional settlement.

Persons

Nikitaras, Greek revolutionary

See also
List of settlements in Arcadia
List of traditional settlements of Greece

References

External links
Arcadia - Leontari

Falaisia
Populated places in Arcadia, Peloponnese